Lordegan (Luri and , also Romanized as Lordegān, Lordgān, and Lordagān; also known as Lordajān, Lordakān, and Lurdagān) is a city in the Central District of Lordegan County, Chaharmahal and Bakhtiari province, Iran, and serves as capital of the county. At the 2006 census, its population was 22,728 in 4,459 households. The following census in 2011 counted 35,276 people in 8,037 households. The latest census in 2016 showed a population of 40,528 people in 10,482 households. The city is populated by Lurs.

References 

Lordegan County

Cities in Chaharmahal and Bakhtiari Province

Populated places in Chaharmahal and Bakhtiari Province

Populated places in Lordegan County

Luri settlements in Chaharmahal and Bakhtiari Province